Lamentation (Pietà) (also Lamentation Over The Dead Christ) is an oil painting on panel of the common subject of the Lamentation of Christ that is now regarded as by an artist in the "circle" of the Early Netherlandish painter Petrus Christus, rather than by Christus himself.  It was painted in c. 1444, and is now in the Louvre in Paris.

History
Bought by the Louvre in 1951 from the Schloss Fuschl Collection for 5,000,000 francs, this work of the Flemish artist belongs to a groups of paintings in which the Italian influence is clearly visible: see for instance, the Entombment, the Nativity, the Death of the Virgin, and the Portrait of a Man.

Petrus Christus, working at Bruges, continued to paint in the style of Jan van Eyck at a time when most Flemish artists had abandoned this manner in favour of Rogier van der Weyden's more dramatic and Gothic character. He seems to have visited Italy some time between 1454 and 1462, and various factors suggest that he may have travelled as far as the south of Italy: Antonello da Messina's influence on him, for example, together with the presence of paintings from his hand in Sicily as early as the 16th century, and certain affinities between his work and that of the School of Naples. He may possibly have contributed to the introduction of the Flemish technique of painting into Italy.

The artist's early manner was dry and awkward, with a tendency towards archaism, but under the beneficial influence of Antonello his work gained in suppleness, revealing a new sense of harmony and rhythm in the compositions, a monumental conception of the figures, and a certain proud dignity of facial expression. The Louvre painting has all these characteristics: the landscape is painted in broad planes, and the diagonal arrangement of the heads and the delicate arabesque on Christ's body contribute to the subtlety of the composition. The Virgin's head is a perfect oval, in the manner of Antonello da Messina; St. John's square-cut face, with his determined jaw, recalls that artist's portraits, and the woman's head seen in profile (very rare in the work of Flemish artists) is also reminiscent of certain heads by Italian painters.

Notes

Further reading
Ainsworth, Maryan W., ed.  Petrus Christus in Renaissance Bruges: An Interdisciplinary Approach.  New York: Metropolitan Museum of Art, 1995.

G. Faggin, Petrus Christus, Fabbri Group, 1966. 
Schabacker, Peter H. Petrus Christus. Utrecht, 1974.
Upton, Joel M. Petrus Christus: His Place in Fifteenth-Century Flemish Painting. University Park and London: Pennsylvania State University Press, 1990.

External links

Web Gallery of Art: Biography of Petrus Christus
Web Gallery of Art: Paintings by Petrus Christus (Religious Paintings)
Web Gallery of Art: Paintings by Petrus Christus (Portraits)
Petrus Christus at Artcyclopedia

1444 paintings
Paintings in the Louvre by Dutch, Flemish and German artists
Paintings by Petrus Christus
Paintings of the Virgin Mary
Christian art about death
Paintings about death
Paintings depicting Mary Magdalene
Petrus